Robert Elsie (June 29, 1950 – October 2, 2017) was a Canadian-born German scholar who specialized in Albanian literature and folklore.

Elsie was a writer, translator, interpreter, and specialist in Albanian studies, being the author of numerous books and articles that focused on various aspects of Albanian culture and affairs.

Life 
Born on June 29, 1950 Vancouver, British Columbia, Canada, Elsie studied at the University of British Columbia, graduating in 1972 with a diploma in Classical Studies and Linguistics. In the following years, he continued his post-graduate studies at the Free University of Berlin, at the École Pratique des Hautes Études and at the University of Paris IV: Paris-Sorbonne, at the Dublin Institute for Advanced Studies, and at the University of Bonn, where he finished his doctorate on Linguistics and Celtic Studies in 1978 at the Linguistics Institute.

From 1978 on, Elsie visited Albania several times with a group of students and professors from the University of Bonn. From 1982 to 1987, he worked for the German Ministry of Foreign Affairs in Bonn, and from 2002 to 2013 for the International Criminal Tribunal for the former Yugoslavia in The Hague, in particular as an interpreter for several noted cases including the trial of Slobodan Milošević.

Elsie's scholarly travels and interest in Albanian dialects brought him into contact with Albanians from Albania, Kosovo, Greece, Montenegro, Italy, Croatia, Bulgaria, Ukraine, Macedonia, and Turkey and made dozens of recordings of the Albanian language.

As a translator Robert Elsie offered the reader “a selection of songs from the best known cycle of Albanian epic verse”.

Elsie during his lifetime authored many works of scholarship and had no major unpublished work left for completion prior to his death.

Death 

On October 2, 2017 Robert Elsie died of motor neuron disease in Bonn, Germany. His last words before passing away were "death is so boring. So slow. One only waits for it". At the time of Elsie's death, it was initially reported in the media that he had requested in his will to be buried in Albania, although it emerged two weeks after those events that Elsie did not specify in his will where to be buried. Instead it was the decision of his life partner, Stephan Trierweiler, that he should be buried in Albania due to the deep love Elsie had for the country.

Elsie's coffin was brought to Albania to lay in repose at the National Library in Tirana for people to come and pay their respects. A farewell ceremony paying tribute to Elsie was held in Tirana, bringing together friends, academics and politicians from Albania, Kosovo and North Macedonia. During his lifetime, Elsie developed a fondness for Theth, seeing it as an Albanian "Shangri-La". On October 18, he was buried in the northern village located in the Albanian Alps. A prolific author of scholarly works, Elsie's untimely death within the context of Albanian studies has been seen as a "big blow" for its international promotion.

Publications 
Below are a selection of his publications of which he was an author, editor or translator. Elsie published around 60 books in English, Albanian or German.

 Robert Elsie, Baron Franz Nopcsa and his contribution to Albanian studies.

Honours 

  Medal of Gratitude (Albania, 15 May 2013) – decorated by President of Albania Bujar Nishani. Robert Elsie received the honour for his contributions as a scholar for over 35 years focusing and internationally promoting the "culture, language, literature and history of Albanians" alongside the "positive image of Albania in the world". Offering his gratitude, President Nishani referred to Elsie as "a good Albanian".

References

External links 
 
 

1950 births
2017 deaths
University of Paris alumni
Canadian expatriates in Ireland
Albanologists
Canadian expatriates in France
Linguists from Canada
Writers from Vancouver
Canadian expatriates in Germany
University of Bonn alumni
Canadian expatriates in the Netherlands
Canadian gay writers
Canadian LGBT journalists
20th-century translators